Mickey Burke may refer to:

 Mickey Burke (footballer) (died 1993), Irish football player
 Mickey Burke (hurler) (born 1927), Irish retired hurler